Geptorem is a 1981 role-playing game adventure for Traveller published by Group One.

Plot summary
Geptorem is the fourth of Group One's Traveller adventures, taking place on an alien world.

Publication history
Geptorem was published in 1981 by Group One as a 20-page book with a large color map.

Reception
William A. Barton reviewed Geptorem in The Space Gamer No. 41. Barton commented that "For creative Traveller referees who haven't the time to design their own worlds and cultures from scratch, Geptorem might prove to be of use - even if it is somewhat overpriced. Compared to newer approved-for-Traveller items such as High Passage and the Paranoia Press supplements, however, the Group One adventure delivers less than it should for the price."

References

Role-playing game supplements introduced in 1981
Traveller (role-playing game) adventures